Lupanine 17-hydroxylase (cytochrome c) (lupanine dehydrogenase (cytochrome c)) is an enzyme with systematic name lupanine:cytochrome c-oxidoreductase (17-hydroxylating). This enzyme catalyses the following chemical reaction

 lupanine + 2 ferricytochrome c + H2O  17-hydroxylupanine + 2 ferrocytochrome c + 2 H+

The enzyme isolated from Pseudomonas putida contains heme c and requires pyrroloquinoline quinone (PQQ) for activity

References

External links 
 

EC 1.17.2